This is a list of the Great Depression-era outlaws spanning the years of Prohibition and the Great Depression known as the "Public Enemy" era. Those include high-profile criminals wanted by state and federal law enforcement agencies for armed robbery, kidnapping, murder, and other violent crime. These are not to be confused with organized crime figures of the same period.

Prohibition and the "Public Enemy" era (c. 1919–1939)

References

External links
 Public Enemy #1 Gallery: Depression-Era Desperadoes
 Gangsters vs. Outlaws
 Booknotes interview with Bryan Burrough on Public Enemies: America's Greatest Crime Wave and the Birth of the FBI, 1933-34, September 19, 2004.

Depression-era outlaws
Out